A phacolith is a pluton of igneous rock parallel to the bedding plane or foliation of folded country rock. More specifically, it is a typically lens-shaped pluton that occupies either the crest of an anticline or the trough of a syncline. In rare cases the body may extend as a sill from the crest of an anticline through the trough of an adjacent syncline, such that in cross section it has an S shape. In intensely folded terrain the hinge of folds would be areas of reduced pressure and thus potential sites for magma migration and emplacement.

The term was coined and initially defined by Alfred Harker in his The Natural History of Igneous Rocks in 1909.

Examples
 in the Franklin and Hamburg areas of Sussex County, New Jersey
 the Omey pluton in Ireland
 near Bayalan, Ajmer district, Rajasthan in India
Corndon Hill, in Shropshire, England

See also
 Laccolith
Lopolith
Batholith

References

Davis A. Young (2003) Mind Over Magma: The Story of Igneous Petrology, page 335, Princeton University Press. 
American Geological Institute. Dictionary of Geological Terms.  New York:  Dolphin Books, 1962.

Igneous rocks
Igneous petrology